The Medicare, Medicaid, and SCHIP Balanced Budget Refinement Act of 1999 (also called the Balanced Budget Refinement Act or BBRA) is a federal law of the United States, enacted in 1999.  The BBRA was first introduced into the House as H.R. 3075 on October 14, 1999, by Rep. William M. Thomas (R-CA) with 75 cosponsors. It was read twice and then referred to the Senate Committee on Finance.  The bill was then slightly altered and reintroduced by Thomas as H.R. 3426 on November 17, 1999.  After referral to the House committees on Ways and Means and Commerce, it was incorporated by cross-reference in the conference report into H.R. 3194 on November 18, 1999.  The H.R. 3194 bill had been introduced by Rep. Ernest J. Istook, Jr. (R-OK) on November 2, 1999, and was enacted with official title: Making consolidated appropriations for the fiscal year ending September 30, 2000, and for other purposes. The State Health Insurance Trial (SCHIP or S. H. 1 - T) was administered by the United States Department of Health and Human Services. 

The BBRA was signed by President Bill Clinton on November 29, 1999, after passing in Congress.

References

External links 
 , Legislative History
 , Legislative History
 , Legislative History

Medicare and Medicaid (United States)
United States federal health legislation
Acts of the 106th United States Congress